Bristol Central High School is a public high school in Bristol, Connecticut, United States. Its mascot is the Ram, and its colors are maroon and white. The school is known for its performing arts group, Central Stage, as well as for its athletics.  The Rams have excelled in basketball, baseball, wrestling, and track in recent years. In 2017, principal Peter Wininger was awarded Varsity Brands 'Principal of Principles,' deeming him the best principal in the United States. The schools Italian Language  teacher Gina Gallo-Reinhardt nominated Wininger for the award, and he and his family were sent to Florida for the ceremony where he was crowned the winner.

Notable alumni 
 Adrian Wojnarowski, 1987: sports columnist who has covered the NBA for Yahoo! Sports and ESPN
 Scott Perkins, 1998: composer
 Michelle Guerette, 1998: Olympic athlete
 Aaron Hernandez, 2007: former NFL tight end and convicted murderer. Was posthumously diagnosed with chronic traumatic encephalopathy (CTE)

References

External links
 

Buildings and structures in Bristol, Connecticut
Public high schools in Connecticut
Schools in Hartford County, Connecticut
Educational institutions established in 1959
1959 establishments in Connecticut